Rujm (rûjm; p. rûjûm) is an Arabic word that appears as an element in numerous place names. It can be translated as "mound, cairn, hill, spur", and also as "stone heap" or "tumulus". The following is a list of place names that include Rujm as an element:

Kanân Rujm Kûddâh, "the peaks of the cairn of the potter", or of "the flint stone for striking fir"
Khirbat er Rujm, "the ruin of the stone heap"
Rujm Abu Ḥashabe
Rujm Abu Helal, "the cairn of Abu Helal"
Rujm Abu Meheir (Rujm Abu Muheir), "the cairn of Abu Meheir"
Rujm Abu Shuweikeh, "the cairn of the thistles"
Rujm Abu Zumeiter, "the cairn of Abu Zumeiter"
Rujm Afâneh, "the cairn of rottenness"
Rujm el 'Ajamy, "the cairn of the Persian"
Rujm 'Alei, "the cairn of the high place"
Rujm 'Atîyeh, "the cairn of 'Atiyeh"
Rujm el 'Azâzimeh, "the cairn of the Azazimeh Arabs"
Rujm el Bahr, "the cairn of the sea"; a site by the name is on the Dead Sea shore near Jericho
Rujm el Bakarah "the cairn of the cow"
Rujm el Bârish, "the cairn of the ground covered with variegated herbiage"
Rujm Bâruk, "the cairn of Baruk"
Rujm Beni Yasser, "rujm of the sons of Yasser" (a fortlet of Nabataean origin)
Rujm Birjis (on the Kerak plateau)
Rujm ed Debbâbeh, "the cairn of the moveable hut"
Rujm ed Deir, "the cairn of the monastery"
Rujm ed Derbi, "the cairn of the roadster"
Rujm edh Dhib, "the cairn of the wolf"
Rujm ed Dîr
Rujm ed Dûribeh, "the cairn of the little road"
Rujm el Fahjeh, "the cairn of el Fahjeh"
Rujm el-Farideyyeh
Rujm Heleiseh, "the cairn of the verdure"
Rujm Handhal, "the cairn of colocynth"
Rujm el Heik, "the cairn of the spindle"
Rujm el-Hamiri, (southeast of Hebron)
Rujm al-Henu, (Jordan)
Rujm el Heri, (southeast of Madaba)
Rujm el-Hiri, "the stone heap of the wild cat"
Rujm el Humeitah, "the cairn of the mountain fig"
Rujm el Hummûs, "the cairn of the chick-pea"
Rujm el Humra, "the red cairn"
Rujm Ibn Basma, "the cairn of Ibn Basma"
Rujm Jemảh, "the cairn of the gathering"
Rujm Jîz, "the cairn on the valley side"
Rujm Jureideh, "the cairn of the troop"
Rujm el Kahakîr, "the cairn of the stone heaps"
Rujm el Kandôl, "the cairn of the thorn tree"
Rujm el-Khadar
Rujm el Kherâzmîyeh, "the cairn of the Kharezinians"
Rujm el Khiâri, "the cairn of the cucumber"
Rujm el Kurrât, "the stone of the attacks"
Rujm Kuteit, "the cairn of the cat" or "the cairn of the crag"
Rujm el Lukâr, "the cairn of Lukâr"
Rujm Al-Malfouf, "circular towers"
Rujm (el Mehawâfet) el Kibliyyeh, "the southern cairn (of the boundary)"
Rujm (el Mehawâfet) esh Shemaliyyeh, "the northern cairn (of the boundary)"
Rujm el-Meshreferh (in Jordan, associated with Mizpah)
Rujm el Mogheifir, "the cairn of the pardoned"
Rujm el Mutukh, "the cairn of the debris"
Rujm en Nâkeh, (Rujm en-Naqa) "the cairn of the she-camel"
Rujm en Niâs, "the cairn of en Niyâs
Rujm en Nûeita, "the cairn of the sailors"
Rujm en Nūkb, "the cairn of the pass"
Rujm er Refeif, "the glittering cairn"
Rujm Reheif, "the sharp-pointed cairn"
Rujm Reiya, "the cairn of quenching thirst", or "the cairn of sweet fragrance"
Rujm es S'â, "the cairn of the tax-gatherers"
Rujm es Sâîgh (Rujm as-Sayigh), "the cairn of the goldsmith"
Rujm es-Sebit
Rujm ash Shami
Rujm ash Shara'irah
Rujm esh Sheikh Suleimân, "the cairn of Sheikh Suleimân"
Rujm Shummer, "the cairn of wild fennel"
Rujm es Sûeif, "the cairn of the little sword"
Rujm at Tarûd, "the cairn of the projection", or "the cairn of the prominent peak"
Rujm Umm el 'Arâis, "the cairn of the mother of brides"
Rujm Umm Kheir, "the cairn of Umm Kheir"
Rujm Umm es Sata, "the cairn of the mother of the assault"
Rujm el Waîr, "the cairn of rugged rocks"
Rujm el Yaklûm, "the cairn of Yaklûm"
Rujm az-Zuwaira (in Zuwaira al-Fauqa, or Upper Zohar)
Rŭjûm el Behîmeh, "the cairns of the beast"
Rujûm Umm Kharrûbeh, "the cairns by the locust tree" (Ceratonia siliqua) (or, "the cairns of the mother of the carob tree")

See also
Glossary of Arabic toponyms
Place names of Palestine

References

Bibliography

Arabic words and phrases
Place names
Lists of place names